Gahnia aristata is a tussock-forming perennial in the family Cyperaceae, endemic to Western Australia.

References

aristata
Plants described in 1878
Flora of Western Australia
Taxa named by George Bentham